Srikantha may refer to:

 Vishnu, a Hindu god
 Srikantha, East Medinipur District, a village in West Bengal, India
 Srikantha (ca. 1050), founder of Shiva Advaita philosophy
 M. Srikantha (17 September 1913 – 4 February 1982), a leading Ceylon Tamil civil servant
 Nallathamby Srikantha, a Sri Lankan Tamil politician and former Member of Parliament